Sonoghur is located in tehsil mastuj of Chitral District, Pakistan. it is famous for its historical importance and natural beauty. due to its mesmerizing views, it is also called "jannat Sonoghur" which means the "heavenly beautiful Sonoghur" 

Populated places in Chitral District